Per Erik Rundquist (1912 – 1986) was a Swedish novelist and poet. He made his literary debut in 1938, with the novel Sven-Patrik. Among his later novels are Kalla mig Ismael! from 1950, and Generalen from 1953. He was awarded the Dobloug Prize in 1974.

References

1912 births
1986 deaths
Swedish poets
Dobloug Prize winners
20th-century Swedish novelists
20th-century Swedish poets
Swedish male poets
Swedish male novelists
20th-century Swedish male writers